Steinera is a genus of lichen-forming fungi in the family Koerberiaceae. It was circumscribed in 1906 by Austrian-Hungarian botanist Alexander Zahlbruckner, who dedicated the genus name to his friend Julius Steiner, an Austrian teacher and lichenologist. The genus was revised by Aino Henssen and Peter Wilfred James in 1982. In 2017, Damien Ernst and Roar Skovlund Poulsen described some new species, and recombined others into the genus based on a study of the genus in the subantarctic islands of Crozet and Kerguelen.

Species
Steinera intricata 
Steinera isidiata 
Steinera latispora 
Steinera lebouvieri 
Steinera membranacea 
Steinera molybdoplaca 
Steinera olechiana 
Steinera pannarioides 
Steinera polymorpha 
Steinera sorediata 
Steinera subantarctica 
Steinera symptychia

References

Peltigerales genera
Lichen genera
Taxa named by Alexander Zahlbruckner